Bad Girl (recorded in 1989, released in 1990) is the sixth studio album by American singer-songwriter La Toya Jackson. 
The album was also released as He's My Brother, Sexual Feeling, Playboy (Be My), Why Don't You Want My Love? and Be My Lover.

Album information 

The album was recorded in 1989 under Teldec Records in Germany, and was supposed to be released in August 1989 under the title On My Own, featuring ten tracks. Disagreements between Jackson's management and Teldec Records caused a cancellation of the album. Sherman Records purchased the album, added two additional Jackson songs – "Sexual Feeling", recorded in Italy, and "You And Me", recorded in Sweden – retitled the album Bad Girl, and finally released it in 1990. Since then the recording has been licensed to countless small record labels, who have released the album under many different titles. Some issues of the albums exclude the tracks "Do the Salsa" or "Piano Man". 

The Bad Girl album is one of the few albums in Jackson's back catalogue that is still in print today, and it continues to be re-released under many different covers and names. The album is among her most well-known due to its wide availability. 

Jackson performed the title song, "Bad Girl", on four German TV shows, including the ZDF Fernsehgarten and NDR Talk-Show. One performance is a clip that utilized blue-screen effects and therefore is often mistaken by people today as an official video clip produced by Jackson's record company. Jackson also performed the song at her 1989 concert at Bally's Reno, A Sizzling Spectacular!.

The track Playboy (Be My) has been incorrectly titled Playboy (Be Me) on some reissues of this album. It was re-recorded in 1991 for La Toya's album No Relations as "Be My Playboy".

Various issues

Deluxe version 
A Deluxe version was released in 2015 by Vibe On Records and contains 21 bonus tracks.

Retro Music issue 
The album issued in 1995 by Retro Music, a Canadian label,  only contains 10 of the 12 original tracks. However, it is still in print and publicly accessible due to its widespread release, and can be found on most major online retailers.

Why Don't You Want My Love? 
A rare German issue of Bad Girl, released in 1993 by the Legend label, was titled Why Don't You Want My Love? and featured the 12 tracks from Bad Girl plus an extra track called "Why Don't You Want My Love? (Bruce Forest Remix)". A single for the track was released on BCM Records and was intended for an all-new album. However, the record label wasn't able to complete the album and this was the only track that ever surfaced. Legend bought the rights to the song and included it with the tracks from Bad Girl.

La Toya – Live 
The live album La Toya – Live features many songs from the Bad Girl album. It is owned by Sherman Records but has remained unreleased.

Track listing

Deluxe version track listing

Singles 
 "Bad Girl" (1989)
 "Sexual Feeling ('La Toya' Remix)" (1990)
 "You and Me" (1990)

References

External links 
 Bad Girl: The Complete Discography – a complete listing of all the known issues of Bad Girl

1990 albums
La Toya Jackson albums